Shoqan (also Romanized as Shoqān) is a city and capital of Jolgeh Shoqan District, in Jajrom County, North Khorasan Province, Iran. At the 2006 census, its population was 2,297, in 628 families.

Shoqan is populated by Kurds.

Geography 
The city of Shoqan, which is located 64 kilometers from Bojnord, the capital of North Khorasan province, is famous as the center of the Shoqan Plain and a summer town in the region. It has a mountainous and moderate climate, which is located in the north of Aladagh mountain and in the south of Saluk and Bahar mountains.

References 

Populated places in Jajrom County

Cities in North Khorasan Province

Kurdish settlements in Iran